Helicópteros del Sureste (also called Helisureste) is a helicopter service based in Mutxamel, Alicante, Spain.

Background
Helicópteros del Sureste is currently the primary responsibility of the "On-Shore" division of the INAERgroup.

The company provides a variety of services:

 passenger services
 air ambulance 
 civil defense support
 forest firefighting
 aerial photography 
 aerial filming

Helicópteros del Sureste obtained a Declaration of Competence to provide scheduled passenger service. Since 1996, they have operated the liner Ceuta-Málaga service from the (Ceuta Heliport and Málaga Airport).

Each year they carry over 20,000 passengers in next-generation aircraft. The company was the first to offer flights from the Algeciras Heliport, providing crucial links through the Strait of Gibraltar.  It also runs the Malta-Gozo helilink.

Destinations

 Ceuta
 Algeciras
 Málaga Airport

Fleet

 Agusta A109S 
 AgustaWestland AW139
 Bell 412SP
 Bell 206
 Aerospatiale SA 330 Puma 
 Kamov Ka-32

Notable employees
The company employed or contracted Mykola Melnyk, a Chernobyl hero helicopter pilot from Ukraine, using his expertise in piloting the Soviet-made Kamov helicopters.

Sources

External links

 Information on Helicópteros del Sureste on Conoceceuta
 Information on Helisureste from the Air Charter Guide
 A Bell 412EP used by Helisureste 
 ROTOROnline info

Airlines of Spain
Economy of the Valencian Community